Fran Dempsey is an Irish actor most famous for his playing the character of Fortycoats in Wanderly Wagon and Fortycoats & Co..

Filmography
 Lapsed Catholics (TV Movie) - Jack Flynn - 1984 
 Caught in a Free State (TV Mini-Series) - Tommy - 1984
 Fortycoats & Co. (TV Series) - Fortycoats
 Men of Consequence (TV Movie) - 1981

References

External links
 

Year of birth missing (living people)
Living people
Irish male television actors